Tamara Mikhaylovna Sosnova (18 December 1949 – 10 August 2011) was a Soviet freestyle swimmer who won two medals at the 1966 European Aquatics Championships. She also competed in the 1968 Summer Olympics but did not reach the finals. Between 1964 and 1968 she won 10 national championships and set 21 national records in 100 m (1), 200 m (4), 400 m (8), 800 m (3), 1500 m (1) and freestyle relays (4).

She was the younger sister of Galina Sosnova. After marriage, she changed her last name to Kravchenko. Her husband, Vladimir Kravchenko, also competed in swimming at the 1968 Summer Olympics. After retiring from swimming she taught at the Russian State Agricultural University.

References

External links
Profile at Infosport.ru 

1949 births
Swimmers from Moscow
Soviet female swimmers
Russian female swimmers
Soviet female freestyle swimmers
Olympic swimmers of the Soviet Union
Swimmers at the 1968 Summer Olympics
European Aquatics Championships medalists in swimming
2011 deaths